Nectandra microcarpa is a species of plant in the family Lauraceae. It is found in Colombia and Peru.

References

microcarpa
Near threatened flora of South America
Taxa named by Carl Meissner
Taxonomy articles created by Polbot
Trees of Colombia
Trees of Peru